The proto-oncogene c-Rel is a protein that in humans is encoded by the REL gene.  The c-Rel protein is a member of the NF-κB family of transcription factors and contains a Rel homology domain (RHD) at its N-terminus and two C-terminal transactivation domains. c-Rel is a myeloid checkpoint protein that can be targeted for treating cancer.  c-Rel has an important role in B-cell survival and proliferation.  The REL gene is amplified or mutated in several human B-cell lymphomas, including diffuse large B-cell lymphoma and Hodgkin's lymphoma.

References

Further reading

External links 
 

Transcription factors